The 1936 Pittsburgh Crawfords baseball team competed in Negro National League (NNL) during the 1936 baseball season. The team compiled a 48–33–2 record and won the NNL pennant. 

The team featured six players who were later inducted into the Baseball Hall of Fame, including player/manager Oscar Charleston; center fielder Cool Papa Bell; catcher Josh Gibson; third baseman Judy Johnson; and pitcher Satchel Paige. 

The team's leading batters were:
 Catcher Josh Gibson - .389 batting average, .783 slugging percentage, 18 home runs, and 66 RBIs in 50 games
 First baseman Johnny Washington -  .344 batting average
 First baseman Oscar Charleston - .344 batting average and .559 slugging percentage
 Left fielder Sam Bankhead - .333 batting average

The team's leading pitchers were Leroy Matlock (10–3, 3.55 ERA) and Satchel Paige (8–2, 3.64 ERA).

References

1936 in sports in Pennsylvania
Negro league baseball seasons